The 1961 Southern 500 was a race that took place at Darlington Raceway on 4 September 1961, in the NASCAR Grand National Series. It was the forty-second race of the 1961 NASCAR Grand National Series.

Nelson Stacy won after 364 laps, after taking the lead from Fireball Roberts late in the race. It was the first of Stacy's four Grand National victories in his career.

Qualifying 

*Did not compete due to unknown reasons.

**Driver changed to Rex White for the race.

Results

Crashes
Among the 43 competitors in the 1961 Southern 500, Marvin Potter, Paul Lewis and Woodie Wilson were involved in a crash, resulting in them coming 32nd, 33rd and 34th respectively. Tiny Lund crashed toward the end of the race, finishing in 15th position.

Thurmond speech
Prior to the commencement of the race, South Carolina Senator Strom Thurmond was present to give a political speech in which he claimed that South Carolina would secede from the United States because of its opposition to civil rights legislation. The American Spectator reported that spectators responded to the speech with enthusiasm, and the infield at Darlington was "so violent and liquor-soaked that the area was fenced off and not even the police would enter for anything less than a shooting".

References 

1961 NASCAR Grand National Series
NASCAR races at Darlington Raceway
1961 in sports in South Carolina